ROKS Seongnam (PCC-775) was a  of the Republic of Korea Navy.

Development and design 

The Pohang class is a series of corvettes built by different Korean shipbuilding companies. The class consists of 24 ships and some after decommissioning were sold or given to other countries. There are five different types of designs in the class from Flight II to Flight VI.

Construction and career 
Seongnam was launched on 11 December 1987 by Daewoo Shipbuilding. The vessel was commissioned on 24 November 2013.

On 18 May 2020, the BRP Rizal and ROKS Seongnam underwent together in an exercise.

Gallery

References
 

Ships built by Daewoo Shipbuilding & Marine Engineering
Pohang-class corvettes
1987 ships
Corvettes of the Cold War